Marian University may refer to:
Marian University (Indiana)
Marian University (Wisconsin)

See also
Marian (disambiguation)